Claws is a 1977 U.S. horror-thriller film.  Released soon after the highly successful Jaws, Claws attempted to translate the man-meets-deadly-animal theme to Alaska.

Plot summary
A mature male grizzly bear, enjoying the tactical advantage of being at home in the Alaskan mountains, is stalked and wounded — but not killed — by illegal poachers. The bear, now in possession of a revenge motive, goes to war against human beings. The death/wounding toll includes a logger, campers, hikers, hunters, a juvenile Boy Scout, and the local sheriff.  With the backing of Alaska Forest Commissioner Ben Jones, master hunter Jason Monroe must find and kill the deadly animal. In so doing he is aided by sidekick Native Alaskan Henry, and is challenged by love rival Howard.

Cast
Jason Evers as Jason Monroe
Leon Ames as Commissioner
Anthony Caruso as Henry
Carla Layton as Chris
Glenn Sipes as Howard
Buck Young as Pilot
Myron Healey as Sheriff
Buck Monroe as Buck Monroe
Wayne Lonacre as Gil Evans
Bill Ratcliffe as Marshal

Production
Claws was shot on location in and around Juneau by Alaska Pictures, an independent production company.

Critical response
Critic Jon Abrams labels Claws "a mishmash of most of the popular genre tropes at the time" of release, but praises the independent film for its "impressive array of stock footage."

References

External links
 

1977 films
Films set in Alaska
Films shot in Alaska
American horror thriller films
1970s English-language films
1970s American films
American natural horror films